The discography of German singer Sandra consists of 10 studio albums, eight compilation albums and 47 singles, including 10 promotional-only singles. Her videography comprises three long-form video releases and 26 music videos.

After enjoying a considerable success as the lead singer of the disco trio Arabesque, particularly in Japan, Sandra began performing solo in 1984, launching her career with a German-language cover of Alphaville's "Big in Japan". Her breakthrough single was "(I'll Never Be) Maria Magdalena", released in 1985, which topped charts in numerous countries and secured her international fame. With Michael Cretu as her manager, producer and composer, and personally a life partner, Sandra went on to score even more European top 10 hit singles, most famously "In the Heat of the Night" (1985), "Everlasting Love" (1987), "Secret Land" (1988), "Hiroshima" (1990) and "Don't Be Aggressive" (1992). Sandra found biggest popularity in continental Europe, Israel, Japan and Brazil. She has reportedly sold over 30 million records worldwide, which makes her one of the most successful female German vocalists ever.

Albums

Studio albums

Compilation albums

Box sets

Singles

Promotional singles

Videography

Video albums

Music videos

Background vocals
Aside from the radio edit version of Andru Donalds' "Precious Little Diamond" (2000), Sandra has participated on 15 different songs for Enigma:

See also
 Enigma
 Arabesque

References

External links
 The official Sandra website
 The official Sandra channel at YouTube
 Sandra at Discogs
 Sandra at AllMusic

Discographies of German artists
Pop music discographies
Disco discographies